Air Marshal Minoo Merwan Engineer, PVSM, MVC, DFC (1 December 1921 – 31 December 1997) was a former Air Officer in the Indian Air Force. He is one of the most decorated officers in the Indian Air Force, with the second-highest civil decoration - the Padma Bhushan, two gallantry awards - the Maha Vir Chakra and the Distinguished Flying Cross, and the highest peace-time distinguished service award - the Param Vishisht Seva Medal.

His elder brother, Air Marshal Aspy Engineer served as the 4th Chief of the Air Staff.

Early life
Engineer was born Aspy Merwan Irani on 1 December 1921  in Lahore, Punjab Province, British India to Meherwan Irani and Maneckbai. Meherwan was a Divisional Engineer for the North Western Railway,. His interest in mechanics led his friends to rename him Engineer. He was the sixth amongst eight siblings - two girls and six boys. His brothers, Aspy, Jungoo and Ronnie, also joined the Indian Air Force, while another brother, Homi, joined the Indian Army. Aspy, Minoo and Ronnie were recipients of the DFC, a unique feat where three brothers were decorated with gallantry awards.

Military career

Early career
Engineer joined the Indian Air Force in 1940, being commissioned on 1 August. He was the third Engineer brother to join the Air Force, after his elder brothers Aspy and Jehangir (Jangoo). During World War II, he served in Burma as a part of No. 3 Squadron IAF. He was awarded the DFC for his part in the Arakan operations. On 30 November 1945, Engineer was promoted to the acting rank of Squadron Leader and appointed commanding officer of No. 8 Squadron IAF.

After the war, on 1 November 1946, he was appointed commanding officer of No. 4 Squadron IAF. The squadron relocated to Miko, Japan as part of the occupation forces. Engineer led the squadron in the relocation and operations in Japan.

Post-Independence
In March 1948, Engineer took command of Air Force Station Srinagar. As Station Commander at Srinagar, he was responsible for all air force operations in Jammu and Kashmir. For this operation, he was awarded the Maha Vir Chakra, the second-highest war-time gallantry award.

The citation for the Maha Vir Chakra reads as follows: 

After the war, in 1949, he was selected to attend the RAF Staff College, Andover. After completing the staff course, he returned to India and was appointed Senior Air Staff Officer (SASO) of the Training Command in Bangalore. On 1 Oct 1954, he was appointed Station Commander of Lohegaon Air Force Station in Pune. He then commanded the newly formed 2 Tactical Air Support Group and 2 Tactical Air Centre at Mumbai and Pune. On 15 April 1959, he was appointed SASO of the Eastern Air Command.

During the Sino-Indian War in 1962, he was appointed Air Officer Commanding (AOC) of the No. 1 Operational Group based at Tezpur. For his services in the Eastern sector, he was awarded the Param Vishisht Seva Medal.

On 5 August 1963, Engineer was promoted to the rank of Air Vice Marshal and appointed Air Officer Commanding-in-Chief Eastern Air Command. After a little over an year, he moved to Air HQ in October 1964 as Deputy Chief of the Air Staff (DCAS). On 1 March 1968, the appointment of DCAS was upgraded to the rank of Air Marshal and Engineer was promoted to the rank.

Indo-Pakistani War of 1971
At the time of Indo-Pakistani War of 1971, he was Air Officer Commanding-in-Chief of Western Air Command. For his part in the war, Engineer was awarded the Padma Bhushan for his leadership and services.

See also
 Aspy Engineer

References

Indian Air Force air marshals
Parsi people
Recipients of the Maha Vir Chakra
1921 births
Recipients of the Padma Bhushan in civil service
1997 deaths
Recipients of the Param Vishisht Seva Medal
Indian Air Force officers
Indian military personnel of World War II
Indian recipients of the Distinguished Flying Cross (United Kingdom)